Mahecha is a Basque surname. Notable people with the surname include:
Carlos Mahecha (born 1992), Colombian swimmer
Juan Mahecha (born 1987), Colombian footballer
Lizeth Mahecha (born 1971), Colombian actress

Basque-language surnames